Colette Fu is a photographer, book artist and paper engineer based in Philadelphia, Pennsylvania, who makes pop-up books from her photographs.  She teaches pop-up courses and community workshops with marginalized populations at various art centers, universities and institutions internationally. Her large-scale, three-dimensional pop-up books feature photographic images which extend towards the viewer for many layers. During an artist residency in Shanghai, Fu designed China's largest pop-up book.  Pop-up and flap books originally illustrated sociological ideas and scientific principles; she constructs her own books on how our selves relate to society today.  In 2008, Fu was awarded a Fulbright Fellowship to create a pop-up book of the 25 ethnic minority groups residing in Yunnan Province, China, from where the artist's mother's family descends.  25 of 55 minority tribes of China reside in Yunnan and comprise less than 9% of the nation's population, with the Han representing the majority.  She uses her artistic skills to spread knowledge and provide a brief portrait of their existence.

Biography
Fu, born in Princeton, New Jersey, is the daughter of Chinese immigrants. After graduating from the University of Virginia, Fu traveled to China with a student tour and shortly returned for three years to teach English and, later, to study Mandarin and art. Fu traveled throughout Yunnan, where her mother, member of the Nuosu Yi community, was born, photographing various people in ethnic dress. After returning to the United States, Fu studied photography at Virginia Commonwealth University and Rochester Institute of Technology, where she began collaging images into detailed hyperreal fantasy scenarios.

Fu's well-received pop-up book series include:
 Haunted Philadelphia explores the psychology of fear and spookiness in locations around the city, such as Fort Mifflin, Rodin Museum, Academy of Music and the Philadelphia State Hospital at Byberry. 
 We Are Tiger Dragon People, started in 2008, is a series of pop-up books showcasing the diversity of ethnic minority communities in Yunnan Province in southwestern China. The books feature aspects of the local culture: festivals, clothing, dance, folklore, deities, and people.
 Tao Hua Yuan Ji, created at the Philadelphia Photo Arts Center, is the World's Largest Photo Book measuring 13.8 x 21 feet, and 5 feet high. People could enter into the pop-up book.

Fu's commercial clients for paper engineering have included LVMH, Vogue China, Canon Asia, Greenpeace and Children's Medical Center in Texas. Fu's books are in collections including Library of Congress, Yale University, Metropolitan Museum of Art and National Museum of Women in the Arts.

Technique
On a visit to her local Borders Book Store, Fu stumbled onto Robert Sabuda's Wizard of Oz pop-up book and was instantly enamored. Fu then learned paper engineering mechanics by reverse engineering pop-up books purchased on eBay while attending numerous artist residencies.

Each of Fu's pop-up books are a single, large format spread. A good variety of her pop-up books are based on her experiences traveling to China and learning about her culture. Fu creates a digital collage using her own photographs on her computer, then "works on the pop-up mechanisms that cause her composition to explode from the page." Fu does all the work herself, including printing and binding, and each pop-up element is cut by hand. Some books include up to 40 photographs and measure 3 x 4.5 feet. An average pop-up can take up to four weeks to design and build.

Extended study of Chinese minorities 
Colette Fu's projects have taken her across the globe and can take years to fully materialize. With the help of a Fulbright fellowship, a recent endeavor found her in southwest Yunnan Province, China, where she studied the local population, learned about their culture and immersed herself in the daily life of its people. The project took ten years to complete, but resulted in some of Fu's most notable work.

Exhibitions

Awards

 Joan Mitchell Painters & Sculptors Grant
 Yaddo Fellowship, 2018
 Meggendorfer Artist Book Prize, 2018
MacDowell Colony Fellowship, 2017
 Pennsylvania Council on the Arts, Project Stream Fund, 2017, 2009
 Center for Emerging Visual Artists, Visual Arts Fellowship, 2015
 Swatch Art Peace Hotel Residency, 2014
 Leeway Transformation Award, 2013
Puffin Foundation Artist Grant 2021, 2015, 2010, 2003
Smack Mellon Hot Picks, 2010
Independence Foundation Artist Fellowship, 2010
 Fulbright Research Fellowship to China, 2008
Fulbright Scholarship, 2008
Virginia Commission for the Arts, Artist Fellowship, 2007
En Foco New Works Award, 2004
Virginia Museum of Fine Arts Artist Fellowship, 2004
Puffin Foundation, Artist Grant, 2003
Society of Photographic Education Achievement Scholarship, 2002

Book contributions
 Making Books with Kids: 25 Paper Projects to Fold, Sew, Paste, Pop, and Draw by Esther K. Smith, 2016. Fu's Spinning Flower Pop-Up, page 83.
 Playing with Pop-Ups: The Art of Dimensional, Moving Paper Designs by Helen Hiebert, 2014. Fu's pattern for a pop-up version of Philadelphia's First Bank of the United States is on pages 60–63.

References

External links 
 
 To Be Seen
 Colette Fu 
 Asian American Life with Paul Lin, starts at timing 20:50
 Articulate with Jim Cotter 
 Asian Art Revives Connection to a Culture Behind
 International Channel Shanghai starts at timing 6:12
 

Living people
American artists of Chinese descent
Pop-up book artists
21st-century American photographers
Rochester Institute of Technology alumni
Year of birth missing (living people)
Virginia Commonwealth University alumni
University of Virginia alumni
People from Princeton, New Jersey
Photographers from New Jersey
Women book artists
21st-century American women photographers